Kenneth Hall (or Ken Hall) may refer to:

 Ken Hall (American football) (born 1935), American high school football player from Sugar Land, Texas
 Ken G. Hall (1901–1994), Australian film director
 Kenneth O. Hall (born 1941), Governor-General of Jamaica
 Kenneth Keller Hall (1918–1999), U.S. federal judge
 Ken Hall (Australian footballer) (born 1980), Australian rules football player
 Kenneth Hall (artist) (1913–1946), British artist
 Kenneth Hall (Illinois politician) (1915–1995), American politician
 Kenny Hall (priest) (born 1959), Dean of Clogher
 Kenny Hall (basketball) (born 1990), American basketball player
 Kenny Hall (musician) (1923–2013), Californian folk musician